The Sweet's Biggest Hits is a 1972 greatest hits album by Sweet. It contains their six hit singles which made the UK chart in 1971/72, the 'B' sides to the first four and an album track, "Chop Chop" which was released as a single in some countries but not in the UK. The album reached number three in Finland.

Track listing

Side one
"Wig-Wam Bam" (Mike Chapman, Nicky Chinn) - 2:57
"Little Willy" (Chapman, Chinn) - 3:10
"Done Me Wrong Alright" (Brian Connolly, Steve Priest, Andy Scott, Mick Tucker) - 2:53
"Poppa Joe" (Chapman, Chinn) - 3:07
"Funny Funny" (Chapman, Chinn) - 2:46
"Co-Co" (Chapman, Chinn) - 3:08

Side two
"Alexander Graham Bell"  (Chapman, Chinn) - 2:50
"Chop Chop" (Chapman, Chinn) - 2:55
"You're Not Wrong for Loving Me" (Connolly, Priest, Scott, Tucker) - 2:44
"Jeanie" (Connolly, Priest, Scott, Tucker) - 2:53
"Spotlight" (Connolly, Priest, Scott, Tucker) - 2:42

References

The Sweet albums
1972 greatest hits albums
Albums produced by Phil Wainman
RCA Records compilation albums
Bell Records compilation albums
Glam rock compilation albums